José Goldschmied Stoupignan (born September 12, 1975, in Mexico City) is a Mexican judoka. He was a national champion at 16 and he participated in the 2004 Summer Olympics in Judo (Men's Middle (81–90 kg))

Personal life
Goldschmied is the son of Gabriel Goldschmied, the president of the Mexican Federation of Judo.

References

External links
 Profile

1975 births
Living people
Mexican male judoka
Judoka at the 2004 Summer Olympics
Olympic judoka of Mexico
Sportspeople from Mexico City
21st-century Mexican people